The Fender HM Strat was an electric guitar produced by Fender Musical Instruments from 1988 until 1992. A relatively radical departure from Leo Fender's classic Stratocaster design, it was Fender's answer to Superstrats produced by manufacturers such as Jackson Guitars and Ibanez. The HM in the guitars name stands for heavy metal.

Specifications
The Fender HM  strat was originally produced in Japan. Some sources say production started as early as 1984. Subsequently, in 1989, it was produced in the United States. Some evidence indicates that assembly in the U.S. with components imported from Japan may have begun as early as 1987.

First Version - 
The first version appeared with a distinct Strat logo in the headstock, 24 medium jumbo frets (i.e. these are thicker and wider frets), a maple neck with rosewood or maple fingerboard and with one of the four neck "bolts" (screws) off-set at the bottom of the neck to allow a more comfortable "heel" area for playing in the upper registers, a lighter basswood body, or occasionally  alder for US made guitars). The scale length is an even , rather than the normal  commonly used on Stratocaster and Telecaster guitars. In addition, the Fender HM Strat had a Kahler licensed double-locking tremolo system, "Spyder", and Gotoh tuners, one DiMarzio humbucking H* "Super 3" pickup ("H" configuration), and sometimes two single coil pickups (S*, HSS configuration), two humbuckers, or sometimes a single additional Super Distortion, (HH configuration) and a side-mounted jack socket. Kahler USA offers a detailed schematic diagram of the Kahler Spyder tremolo and several (but not all) replacement parts are available.

Japanese-assembled guitars have colored polyester on the bodies, and clear polyester on the necks. American-assembled HM Strats have a very hard aircraft grade urethane color and clear coats on the body, while still using a polyester finish on the neck.

Second Version  - 
The US HM series stratocasters were produced in 1990 (possibly late 1988 with Japanese sourced components) and included the Strat 10-3200 (i.e. cont. strat, HSS), 10-2100 (HSS), 10-2102 (HSS), 10-2200 (1 silver sensor, H), 10-2300 (HH) and 10-2400 (H) models.

How to distinguish between Japanese and US assembled Fender HM Strats  - 
The USA model features a DiMarzio Super 3 humbucker (hex poles) with American Standard single coils in the middle and neck, which are easily distinguishable by the red/white wires (middle) and blue/white wires (neck) that are visible while looking straight at the pickup. The Japanese models feature the more generic black/white wires on the single coils as well as a DiMarzio Super Distortion (which also has hex poles). Moreover, the 1988 price list describes the line as merely "H.M. Series Stratocaster", while the 1989 price list mentions, "U.S. H.M. Series Stratocaster" from which one might garner that the earliest models were the Japan/US collaboration, followed by a straight USA-made model. 

HM Strat Ultra - 
Later on (in around 1990), Fender introduced the USA HM Strat Ultra that is considered by many to be superior to the previous HM versions. Fender HM Strat ultra differs in that it has 4 Lace Sensor pickups in HSS configuration (these pickups are considered less noisy/aggressive and sometimes less preferred for HM Strat than those found in the Fender HM Strat), a smaller 'digitalized' Strat logo (considered to be more discreet) and an ebony fingerboard with split-triangle inlays. The Fender logo on the headstock is of mother of pearl.

2020 Reissue -
At the 2020 NAMM Show, Fender introduced a limited edition reissue of the HM Strat. The reissue keeps the Gotoh tuners and HSS design, but replaces the Kahler Spyder tremolo with a Floyd Rose bridge and the DiMarzio and Lace Sensor pickups in previous versions with Fender-developed hi-gain pickups.

Background and user reception 
In 1985, a group of musically dedicated people and investors led by William Schultz purchased the Fender company from Columbia Broadcasting System (CBS). The building that contained the equipment was not part of the sale, so the plant was relocated. During this period, when there was little to no production of instruments in the U.S., Fender imported instruments made by Fender Japan/FujiGen, many of which were the "Contemporary" Stratocasters and Telecasters. These were sold in the U.S., along with "vintage" spec models, from 1985 on up almost through the end of the HM Strat era. Thus, it is not unusual that a Fender HM strat may have Japanese-made components (e.g. neck) assembled in the US.

The Contemporary Stratocaster was eventually supplanted by the HM Strat in 1988, which went through subsequent versions. The first U.S. Fender Superstrat was the adaptation of the Japanese HM Strat, plus the addition of the U.S. Contemporary Stratocaster, in 1989.

However, this model was also opposed by Fender purists as its features were "off the Fender's beaten track". The use of a humbucker (instead of a single coil), 24 jumbo frets (instead of 21 or 22 regular frets) and occasionally basswood (instead of the typical alder or ash) as well as the overall appearance were not particularly welcomed by most conservative Fender fans. Today, a well-maintained Fender HM Strat becomes increasingly rare to find. As with most discontinued instruments, however, this guitar is also hard to maintain. For instance, although Kahler USA provides product support for the Kahler Spyder tremolo parts, various other components of this guitar such as knobs are currently unavailable.

Notable users 
The Fender HM strat was endorsed by  Greg Howe. Many of which were featured on album covers up until 1995 Parallax. In recent years, guitarist Ethan Brosh has been spotted playing old '80s HM Strats as his touring instrument of choice. Jeff Nations, guitarist for JB Crockett, also uses a U.S. HM Strat in his touring rig.

References

External links

Fender instruments homepage
  HeavyMetalStrat.com - Informational website all about the HM Strat guitars
The manual of the Japanese HM strats in Pdf

HM strat